"Europa (Earth's Cry Heaven's Smile)" is an instrumental from the Santana album Amigos, written by Carlos Santana and Tom Coster. It is one of Santana's most popular compositions and it reached the top in the Spanish Singles Chart in July 1976.

The 16-bar chord progression follows the Circle of Fifths, similar to the jazz standard "Autumn Leaves". Every other verse ends with a Picardy cadence.

Genesis 
Upon seeing a friend suffering a bad experience whilst high on mescaline, Santana composed a piece titled "The Mushroom Lady's Coming to Town". This precursor contained the first lick to "Europa". The piece was put away and not touched for some time.

When Santana was touring with Earth, Wind & Fire in Manchester, England, he played this tune again, this time with Tom Coster who helped him with some of the chords and thus Europa was born. It was renamed as "Europa (Earth's Cry Heaven's Smile)".

Several reports
claim that when Carlos Santana visited the Soviet Union in 1987, a controversy arose as some said the Armenian composer Arno Babajanian recognised the first eight measures of Europa, when he first heard it, as his own composition "Мосты" ("Bridges"), released in 1959.

Other versions 
One rendition was by saxophonist Gato Barbieri off his 1976 album Caliente! In 2006, saxophonist Jimmy Sommers recorded the song for his Standards album Time Stands Still. Contemporary jazz guitarist Nils released a rendition from his 2009 album Up Close & Personal. Blake Aaron covers the song on his 2015 album Soul Stories.

Another rendition is the one made by Tuck Andress during the 1990s.

Spanish musician Dyango sang a version accompanied by Paco de Lucia, with lyrics set to the melody.

Vital Information recorded their version on the Vitalive! album with Frank Gambale on guitar.

References

1976 songs
Santana (band) songs
Songs written by Carlos Santana